Luis Alberto Acosta (born 15 December 1952) is a Uruguayan footballer. He played in 15 matches for the Uruguay national football team from 1983 to 1988. He was also part of Uruguay's squad for the 1983 Copa América tournament.

References

External links
 

1952 births
Living people
Uruguayan footballers
Uruguay international footballers
Association football forwards
Montevideo Wanderers F.C. players
Club América footballers
Club Atlético River Plate footballers
Peñarol players
C.F. Cobras de Querétaro players
Barcelona S.C. footballers
L.D.U. Quito footballers
Huracán Buceo players
C.D. Cuenca footballers
Uruguayan expatriate footballers
Expatriate footballers in Mexico
Expatriate footballers in Argentina
Expatriate footballers in Ecuador
Uruguayan football managers
Montevideo Wanderers managers